The individual eventing at the 1928 Summer Olympics (referred to at the time as the "competition for the equestrian championship") took place at Hilversum.  The event consisted of a dressage competition, a jumping competition, and an endurance test.  Scores in each component were added to give a total. Scores from the individual competition were summed to give results in the team competition.

Results
Source: Official results; De Wael

References

Equestrian at the 1928 Summer Olympics